"Step and a Step" is a song by Japanese girl group NiziU. It is the group's debut maxi single and includes three other tracks. The song was pre-released digitally on November 25, 2020, and the CD single was released on December 2 by JYP Entertainment and Epic Records Japan.

Background and release

NiziU was formed through the audition program, Nizi Project by JYP Entertainment and Sony Music Entertainment Japan, and is the first Japanese group to be managed by JYP. The group released its pre-debut EP Make You Happy in June 2020, which peaked at number one on both Oricon's digital album's chart and Billboard Japans Hot Albums chart. Following the commercial success of Make You Happy, NiziU announced the release of their debut Japanese single titled "Step and a Step". Solo jacket album photos for group members Mako, Rio, and Maya, were released simultaneously on October 10. An online autograph session was announced the same day in which NiziU members would fulfill requests from fans. Album jacket photos featuring Riku, Ayaka, and Mayuka, were released on October 11, followed by photos of all members on October 12. In lead-up to the release of the single, an online collaboration campaign between NiziU and Lawson Store began in early-November. Despite participating in the recording of the single and appearing in the music video, Miihi was absent from the dance choreography portion and promotions for the single due to going on hiatus for health problems from October to December 2020.

On November 25, 2020, "Step and a Step" was pre-released as a digital single on various online music portals in conjunction with the accompanying music video. The CD single was officially released on December 2, 2020. The physical version is available in four different limited editions: Regular Edition, First Press Limited Edition A and First Press Limited Edition B, and Fan Club Edition (With U Limited Edition). Edition A comes with a CD and a DVD containing the music video of "Step and a Step" and the making of album jacket photos. Edition B contains a CD and a 28-page booklet while the regular edition includes only the CD. All three versions contain "Step and a Step" as A-side and three other tracks "Joyful", "Sweet Bomb" and "Make You Happy" as B-side. The fanclub edition comes with the CD featuring only "Step and a Step" and "Joyful".

Composition
"Step and a Step" has lyrics written by Kentz, Yui Kimura, and Park Jin-young, with the latter also serving as the composer. Park Jin-young produced the track alongside Lee Hae-sol. A youthful and energetic pop song with an "addictive" rhythm, its lyrics convey "a warm message" that is intended to heal listeners during the COVID-19 pandemic, through lines like, "It's okay if you go slowly, step by step, at your own pace".

Music video
The music video for the song was uploaded to JYP Entertainment's YouTube channel on November 25, 2020. The music video is magical and features NiziU dressed in immaculate, white dresses as the members are seen performing choreography in multiple colorful settings. The video also includes a "rabbit" dance during the song's chorus.

Promotion
A documentary series titled We NiziU: We need U began airing on Hulu from November 5, 2020, focussing on NiziU's journey towards their official debut. To commemorate the release of group's debut single, a one-time commercial featuring "Step and a Step" would be aired on NTV on November 25, 2020. In addition, 15-second solo commercials featuring each NiziU member would be broadcast on the Nippon TV affiliated stations of Kansai, Chubu, Hokkaido, Fukuoka, Miyagi and Okinawa corresponding to the home-towns of each member, from November 26 to December 2. "Step and a Step" was first performed on Nippon TV's Best Artist 2020 year-end programme on November 25.

Korean version
"Step and a step" (Korean version) was released as part of the limited edition B of U on November 24, 2021.

Track listing

Charts

Weekly charts

Year-end charts

Certifications

References

2020 debut singles
NiziU songs
Japanese-language songs
Songs written by Park Jin-young
Oricon Weekly number-one singles
Billboard Japan Hot 100 number-one singles
JYP Entertainment singles
Sony Music Entertainment Japan singles